Khwairakpam Bishwamittra is an Indian film director, actor and script writer who works in theatre and Manipuri films. He first appeared on silver screen in the 1996 hit film Kanaga Hinghouni, where he co-directed with Chan Heisnam. Some of the famous films he directed include Kaorage, Torei and Sur Da Ngaojabee. He is also a renowned playwright of Manipuri Shumang Leelas and stage plays produced by AIR Imphal and Doordarshan DDK Imphal. As of 2022, his non-feature Eewai got official selection at the 4th Nepal Cultural International Film Festival 2022.  Eewai was screened at the 28th Kolkata International Film Festival in Short and Documentary Panorama section on 19th and 21st December 2022 at Nandan-III and Sichir Mancha, Kolkata.

Education
Bishwamittra enrolled at Newport University to pursue a bachelor's degree in Telecommunication Engineering. He also earned a bachelor's degree from Manipur University in Political Science (Honors). He received double diploma in Theatre from National Theatre, Studies and Rupmahal Theatre; and diploma in Music from Kharagarh University.

Career
Bishwamittra became a renowned figure in the Manipuri film industry as a director and an actor with his debut film Kanaga Hinghouni (1996), where he co-directed with Chan Heisnam. Pairing with Ksh. Kishorekumar, he co-directed four movies, Iral Oirage (1997), Amambasu Anganbani (1998), Aroiba Natte (1999) and Thamoinadi Kouhouri (2001), produced by Chan Heisnam under the banner Bright Film Manipur. In 2001, he directed Shiroi Lily produced by S. Ibomcha Singh for SB Sons Film and Yaoshangi Meiri (2002) produced by Laishram Lokendra for EUM Imphal. So far, he has directed 54 Manipuri feature films, 19 short fictions and 4 documentaries. He wrote scripts and directed the ballets The Third Eye for Adult Education Department, Government of Manipur in 2007 and Wakollo for Lalit Kala Sangam Imphal in 2014. His short fictions Hang Hang, The Boiling Blood and The Skiff, where he worked as director and script writer, got official selections at the Mumbai International Film Festival (MIFF). Hang Hang was selected in the 18th International Children Film Festival 2013, Hyderabad. In 2009, he produced and directed the movie Shak Henba Bhoot.

Besides films, he is a Senior A Grade approved drama artiste of AIR Imphal and also a Senior Fellow in Dramatic Literature under Ministry of Culture, Government of India. He is an approved announcer of Doordarshan Imphal and AIR Imphal. Bishwamittra is also an empanelled producer of PPC (NE) Doordarshan Guwahati, Doordarshan Imphal and Doordarshan Itanagar. He also worked as an actor and assistant director in the Mahabharat audio drama serial of 53 Episodes produced from 1999 to 2002. He was the Vice President of Film Forum Manipur, Imphal.

Accolades

Selected filmography: Feature Films

References

Living people
Film directors from Manipur
Indian film directors
Meitei people
People from Imphal East district
1965 births